The 2013 Conference League South was the first season under the new name. Founded in 2013 as a result of the restructuring of the game below the professional level. The Rugby League Conference which was broken up in 2011 was replaced for one season in 2012 by the National Conference League Division 3 which was placed under the banner of the National Conference League which had moved from winter to summer. Bristol Sonics, St Albans Centurions and Nottingham Outlaws moved across from National Conference League Division 3. The top two from Midlands Rugby League Premier Division, Northampton Demons as champions and Leicester Storm as runners-up moved up and a new club Sheffield Hallam Eagles, a joint venture set up by Sheffield Eagles and Sheffield Hallam University made up the 6 team competition. The teams would play each other three times during the regular season with the top four contesting the play-offs. The season ran from April to August

Clubs

League table

Play-offs

Results

Player statistics

Top try scorer

Top goal kicker

Top point scorer

Sources 
 statistics

External links 
 Conference League South website
 Nottingham Outlaws website
 Bristol Sonics website
 Leicester Storm website
 Sheffield Hallam Eagles website
 St Albans Centurions website
 St Albans Centurions website

Rugby Football League